Crackin' the Safe is the second EP by the southern rock band Saving Abel. This EP is available on iTunes. The EP was self produced and released under the label Skiddco Records.

Track listing

References

2013 EPs
Saving Abel EPs